Yeti Obhijaan (English:Yeti Adventures) is an Indian Bengali adventure thriller film directed by Srijit Mukherji and produced by Shrikant Mohta, Mahendra Soni under the banner of Shree Venkatesh Films. The film stars Prosenjit Chatterjee and Aryann Bhowmik in lead roles. The film is a sequel to Mishawr Rawhoshyo. It is an adaptation of Pahar Churaye Aatonko from the Bengali adventure series Kakababu by author Sunil Gangopadhyay.

Plot
After the mysterious disappearance of mountaineer Caine Shipton, rumours of the giant beast Yeti are spread all over the world. Kakababu and Sontu embark on an adventurous journey to Gorokhshep Plateau at the base of Mount Everest to unveil the mystery. With the help of Nepali special force officers Jang Bahadur Rana and Tribhuban Gupta and loyal sherpa Mingma, they expose the illegal ventures going on under the caves of the mountain, with Caine Shipton himself being the mastermind behind it.

Cast
 Prosenjit Chatterjee as Raja Roy Chowdhury a.k.a. Kakababu
 Aryann Bhowmik as Sunanda Roy Chowdhury a.k.a. Sontu
 Jisshu Sengupta as Jung Bahadur Rana (Guest Appearance)
 Bidya Sinha Saha Mim as Chitrangada Verma
 Ferdous as Thomas Tribhuvan Gupta
 Alexx O'Nell as Caine Shipton
 Nima Norbu Lama as Mingma

Production
Yeti Obhijaan is produced by Shree Venkatesh Films. The film was originally intended to be a joint venture between India and Bangladesh, with the production company Jaaz Multimedia set to serve as the Bangladeshi co-producer, and this would eventually lead to the casting of Bangladeshi actors Ferdous Ahmed and Bidya Sinha Saha Mim. However, due to conflicts with filming, Jaaz Multimedia removed their investment and the film became solely an Indian film.

The film was shot in India and Switzerland.

Release
Yeti Obhijaan released on Durga Puja 2017. This is the first 3D film of Bengal, but will now witness a 2D release due to some infrastructure constraints. The sole reason for the same is the lack of sufficient 3D screens in West Bengal. As per multiplex reports, a 3D version of a film always has a better pull than its 2D version.

Soundtrack

 
The songs and background score of Yeti Obhijaan are composed by Indradeep Dasgupta. All songs are sung by Arijit Singh, Rupam Islam, Anupam Roy and Papon. The first song "Kakababur Obhijaan" was released in 3 September 2017. The second single from the soundtrack, "Jete Hawbe", released on 15 September.

Reception
The film received mixed reviews from critics.The Times of India gave the film a 2.5 star rating out of five, and commented, "On the whole, Yeti Obhijaan is disappointing. Pahar Churaye Aatonko is one of the best Kakababu adventures and it is sad to see our childhood nostalgia snuffed out on screen. It fails to thrill, let alone entertain. It is too early to say that Srijit Mukherjee has lost his mojo, but his storytelling is a shadow of what it used to be a few years back. It seems that there was a time when he wanted to tell stories, today he wants to helm projects. And the difference shows."

Sequel
Third sequel of this Kakababu franchise, Kakababur Protyaborton is scheduled to release in October 2021.

References

External links
 

Bengali-language Indian films
2010s Bengali-language films
Indian sequel films
Films shot in Switzerland
Indian adventure films
Films about Yeti
Films about Mount Everest
Films set in Nepal
Films directed by Srijit Mukherji
Indian detective films
Indian mystery films
Films based on Indian novels
2010s adventure films
Films about cryptids
Films based on works by Sunil Gangopadhyay
Films scored by Indradeep Dasgupta